1980 Women's Nordic Football Championship was the seventh edition of the Women's Nordic Football Championship tournament. It was held from 10 July to 13 July in Gothenburg, Mölndal, and Öckerö in Sweden.

Standings

Results

Goalscorers 
4 goals
  Pia Sundhage
3 goals
  Görel Sintorn
2 goals
  Inge Hindkjær
  Karin Ödlund
1 goal
  Britta Ehmsen
  Jette Hansen
  Anne Grete Holst
  Irmeli Leskinen
  Susanne Lundmark
  Ingegerd Lundstedt
  Kari Nielsen
  Susanne Niemann
  Grete Pedersen
  Ann Stengård

Sources 
Nordic Championships (Women) 1980 Rec.Sport.Soccer Statistics Foundation
Lautela, Yrjö & Wallén, Göran: Rakas jalkapallo — Sata vuotta suomalaista jalkapalloa, p. 418–419. Football Association of Finland / Teos Publishing 2007. .

Women's Nordic Football Championship
1980–81 in European football
1980 in women's association football
1980–81
1980 in Norwegian football
1980 in Finnish football
1980 in Swedish football
1980 in Danish football
July 1980 sports events in Europe
1980 in Swedish women's sport